Patrick Bellenbaum (born 28 April 1974) is a German former field hockey player. He competed in the men's tournament at the 1996 Summer Olympics.

References

External links
 

1974 births
Living people
German male field hockey players
Olympic field hockey players of Germany
Field hockey players at the 1996 Summer Olympics
Sportspeople from Oberhausen
1998 Men's Hockey World Cup players
20th-century German people